Ptyelus is a genus of true bugs belonging to the family Aphrophoridae.

The species of this genus are found in Europe, Africa and Southeastern Asia.

Species

Species:

Ptyelus affinis 
Ptyelus basivitta

References

Aphrophoridae